The Roman Catholic Diocese of San Bartolomé de Chillán is a diocese located in the city of Chillán in the Ecclesiastical province of Concepción in Chile. (The diocese name was changed on November 1, 2017.)

History
 1916: Established as Mission “sui iuris” of Chillán from the Diocese of Concepción
 18 October 1925: Promoted as Diocese of Chillán
 1 November 2017: Renamed as Diocese of San Bartolome de Chillán

Leadership, in reverse chronological order
 Bishops of San Bartolome de Chillán (Roman rite), below
 Bishop Sergio Hernán Pérez de Arce Arriagada, SS.CC. (6 February 2020 –)
 Bishop Carlos Pellegrín Barrera, S.V.D. (see below 2017 November 1 – 2018 September 21)
 Bishops of Chillán (Roman rite), below
 Bishop Carlos Pellegrín Barrera, S.V.D. (2006 March 25 – 2017 November 1 see above)
 Bishop Alberto Jara Franzoy (1982 April 30 – 2006 March 25)
 Bishop Francisco José Cox Huneeus (1974 December 14 – 1981 November 9), appointed Coadjutor Archbishop of La Serena
 Bishop Eladio Vicuña Aránguiz (1955 August 28 – 1974 July 16), appointed Archbishop of Puerto Montt
 Bishop Jorge Larraín Cotapos (1937 March 20 – 1955 August 10)
 Bishop Martín Rucker Sotomayor (1925 December 14 – 1935 January 6)
 Bishop Martín Rucker Sotomayor (Apostolic Administrator 1923 March 16 – 1925 December 14)
 Fr. Luis A. Venegas Henríquez (Apostolic Administrator 1922 – 1924)
 Fr. Zacarías Muñoz Henríquez (Apostolic Administrator 1920 – 1921)
 Bishop Reinaldo Muñoz Olave (Apostolic Administrator 1916 March 1 – 1920)

References

Sources
 GCatholic.org
 Catholic Hierarchy
  Diocese website

Roman Catholic dioceses in Chile
Christian organizations established in 1916
Roman Catholic dioceses and prelatures established in the 20th century
Chillan, Roman Catholic Diocese of
1916 establishments in Chile